Networker may refer to:

 EMC Legato Networker, a computer backup software
 Networker (train), a family of multiple unit trains which operate on the UK railway system
 Networker, one of the Non-player characters on My Lego Network